Surprise Mohlomolleng Moriri (born 20 March 1980 in Matibidi, Mpumalanga) is a South African former professional footballer who used to play as a midfielder or striker. He has also represented South Africa internationally and has amassed 34 caps since his debut in 2003.

Club career
Moriri is a free-scoring midfielder who was chosen as South Africa's PSL Player of the Season in 2005–06. He usually plays as a second striker or behind the striker as a supporting striker. He can also be deployed on the right side of midfield. He scored 12 goals in all competitions (11 in the league) to be Sundowns' top scorer and help the 'Brazilians' to their first league title since 2000.

In the 2006–07 season he eclipsed that amount, with again 11 league goals and three in the CAF Champions League.

The 2007–08 season saw him less prolific in the league only managing three league goals but in the process scoring two Nedbank Cup goals, one MTN 8 goal, one Tekom Knockout goal and four CAF Champions League, giving him a total of 11 goals.

On 18 June 2007, Sundowns played a friendly against FC Barcelona in South Africa. Moriri scored within one minute and 30 seconds to make it 1–0. After many missed chances from both teams, Barcelona eventually went on to win the game 2–1 after two late goals from substitutes Santiago Ezquerro and Marc Crosas Luque.

International career
Moriri made his debut in a friendly match against Lesotho on 8 October 2003.

He scored his first goal for South Africa in their 3–0 win over Chad in the MTN Africa Cup of Nations qualifiers.

He was in the South African squad for the 2008 African Nations Cup.

He was part of the Bafana Bafana squad for the 2010 World Cup, coming off the bench against Uruguay.

International goals

References

External links
 

1980 births
Living people
South African soccer players
Association football midfielders
Association football forwards
South Africa international soccer players
2008 Africa Cup of Nations players
Platinum Stars F.C. players
Mamelodi Sundowns F.C. players
2010 FIFA World Cup players
People from Thaba Chweu Local Municipality